GLOBO plc provides enterprise mobility management (EMM) and mobile application development (MADP) software and services. Globo was listed on the London Stock Exchange's AIM market (GBO: LN) Globo acquired Notify Technology in October 2013, adding Mobile Device Management (MDM) capabilities to its EMM product offering and expanding its operations in the USA. In June 2014, Globo acquired Sourcebits, a designer and developer of apps.

On 23 October 2015, trading in Globo shares was suspended. On 26 October, CEO Konstantinos Papadimitrakopoulos and CFO Dimitris Gryparis resigned, having informed the board of directors about "certain matters regarding the falsification of data and misrepresentation of the company's financial situation". Globo stated that they would appoint an independent forensic accounting team to investigate allegations raised by Quintessential Capital Management, an American hedge fund. According to an official announcement of the Company on 26 October 2015, "Mr. Papadimitrakopoulos advised the Company that up to 22 October 2015 he has sold 42,049,655 shares of GLOBO plc". The company was dissolved in January 2017.

Industry Recognition 
For its EMM product line, the company was recognized as a Niche player in Gartner’s first Magic Quadrant report for EMM in 2014 & 2015 as well as in Ovum’s 2014-2015 Decision Matrix report for EMM.

For its MADP product line, the company was recognized as a Challenger in Gartner's 2015 MADP magic quadrant report, in Gartner's 2015 Critical Capabilities for MADP report, and in Ovum’s 2015-2016 Decision Matrix report for MADP.

References

External links
 Official website

Information technology companies of the United Kingdom